Colquitt may refer to:

Places
 Colquitt, Georgia, city in Miller County, Georgia, U.S.A.
 Colquitt, Texas, an unincorporated community
 Colquitt County, Georgia

People with the surname
 Alfred Colquitt, son of Walter T. Colquitt, Confederate General, Governor of Georgia, and U.S. Senator from Georgia (1824-1894)
 Betsy Colquitt (born 1927), American modernist poet
 Britton Colquitt, punter for the Minnesota Vikings of the NFL
 Craig Colquitt, former American football punter for the Pittsburgh Steelers of the NFL, father of Dustin and Britton Colquitt, and brother of Jimmy Colquitt
 Dustin Colquitt, punter for the Kansas City Chiefs of the NFL
 Jerry Colquitt (born 1972), American football player
 Jimmy Colquitt, former punter for the Seattle Seahawks of the NFL
 Oscar Branch Colquitt, Governor of Texas 1911-1915
 Peyton H. Colquitt, Confederate officer killed at the Battle of Chickamauga
 Walter Terry Colquitt, lawyer, Methodist preacher, U.S. Representative and Senator from Georgia (1799-1855)